Ward Farhan Al Salama (born 15 July 1994) is a Syrian professional footballer who plays for Al-Qaisumah and the Syrian national team.

International career 
On 19 November 2019, Al Salama scored his first goal for Syria in the major competition of the 2022 FIFA World Cup qualification against the Philippines in a 1–0 victory.

Career statistics

International 
Scores and results list Syria's goal totally first.

References

External links
 

1994 births
Living people
Syrian footballers
Syrian expatriate footballers
Syria international footballers
Association football midfielders
Al-Karkh SC players
Al-Jaish Damascus players
Al-Wehdat SC players
Tishreen SC players
Al-Bukayriyah FC players
Al-Qaisumah FC players
Syrian Premier League players
Jordanian Pro League players
Iraqi Premier League players
Saudi First Division League players
Expatriate footballers in Iraq
Expatriate footballers in Jordan
Expatriate footballers in Saudi Arabia
Syrian expatriate sportspeople in Iraq
Syrian expatriate sportspeople in Jordan
Syrian expatriate sportspeople in Saudi Arabia
Syrian expatriate sportspeople in Bahrain
Expatriate footballers in Bahrain
Manama Club players
Bahraini Premier League players